The 2022 PDC Nordic & Baltic ProTour consists of 10 darts tournaments on the 2022 PDC Pro Tour.

Prize money
The prize money for the Nordic & Baltic ProTour events remained the same from 2021, with each event having a prize fund of €5,000.

This is how the prize money is divided:

January

Nordic & Baltic ProTour 1  
ProTour 1 was contested on Saturday 29 January 2022 at the Slangerup Dart Club in Slangerup, Denmark.

Nordic & Baltic ProTour 2 
ProTour 2 was contested on Sunday 30 January 2022 at the Slangerup Dart Club in Slangerup, Denmark.

June

Nordic & Baltic ProTour 3 
ProTour 3 was contested on Saturday 4 June 2022 at the Hotelli Tallukka, Vääksy, Finland. The tournament was won by Darius Labanauskas.

Nordic & Baltic ProTour 4 
ProTour 4 was contested on Sunday 5 June 2022 at the Hotelli Tallukka, Vääksy, Finland. The tournament was won by Dennis Nilsson.

July

Nordic & Baltic ProTour 5 
ProTour 5 was contested on Saturday 30 July 2022 at the Slangerup Dart Club in Slangerup, Denmark. The tournament was won by Andreas Harrysson.

Nordic & Baltic ProTour 6 
ProTour 6 was contested on Sunday 31 July 2022 at the Slangerup Dart Club in Slangerup, Denmark. The tournament was won by Daniel Larsson.

August

Nordic & Baltic ProTour 7 
ProTour 7 was contested on Friday 12 August 2022 at the Bellevue Park Hotel in Riga, Latvia. The tournament was won by Darius Labanauskas.

Nordic & Baltic ProTour 8 
ProTour 8 was contested on Saturday 13 August 2022 at the Bellevue Park Hotel in Riga, Latvia. It was won by Darius Labanauskas.

Nordic & Baltic ProTour 9 
ProTour 9 was contested on Saturday 13 August 2022 at the Bellevue Park Hotel in Riga, Latvia. It was won by Darius Labanauskas.

Nordic & Baltic ProTour 10 
ProTour 10 was contested on Sunday 14 August 2022 at the Bellevue Park Hotel in Riga, Latvia. It was won by Marko Kantele.

References 

2022 in darts
2022 PDC Pro Tour